Silver Wind is a small cruise ship operated by Silversea Cruises, a luxury cruise line. The ship entered service in 1995 and is the second ship of her class, the first being her sister ship Silver Cloud, in service since 1994. She can accommodate 296 guests.

References

Notes

Bibliography

External links

Silversea: Silver Wind – Silversea official site page about the ship

Cruise ships
Ships built in Genoa
1995 ships